The 2011 Amarillo Venom season was the team's eighth season as a football franchise and second in the Indoor Football League (IFL). One of twenty-two teams that competed in the IFL for the 2011 season, the Venom were members of the Lonestar Division of the Intense Conference. Led by head coach Rodney Blackshear for the first 9 games, he was replaced by interim head coach Julian Reese. The team played their home games at the Amarillo Civic Center in Amarillo, Texas.

Schedule

Preseason

Regular season

** = Replacement Team.

Standings

Roster

Amarillo Venom
Amarillo Venom
Amarillo Venom seasons